Kelsey Park is a public park in Beckenham in the borough of Bromley, Greater London. It historically formed the landscaped park of the Kelsey Manor Estate. The river Beck runs through it.

History

The original mansion was built around 1408 for William Kelshulle and demolished around 1800. A second mansion was built for Richard Bennett around that time and then acquired by Peter Richard Hoare, the elder (a partner in the banking firm C. Hoare & Co) in 1835. Peter Richard Hoare, the elder converted the manor into a rambling Gothic Revival house. The house passed to Peter Richard Hoare, the younger in 1849: he added a chapel, designed by Sir George Gilbert Scott, in 1869. It then passed to Charles Arthur Richard Hoare in 1877.

The land adjoining Wickham Road was sold in the 1890s and laid out with large Arts and Crafts movement houses designed by Francis Hooper. The house became a convent for the All Saints Sisters of the Poor in 1895 and then became Kepplestone School for the Daughters of Gentlemen in 1901. Following the death of Charles Arthur Richard Hoare in 1908, Beckenham Urban District Council acquired the estate in 1911.

Kelsey Park was officially opened to the public by Right Honourable John Burns MP, President of the Local Government Board, on 31 May 1913. The house itself was used by the British Army during the First World War and was demolished in 1921.

Kelsey Park Sports College which was opened in 1968 takes its name from the fact it was built on the historic Kelsey Park Estate; however following Academy conversion in September 2011 it was renamed to Harris Academy Beckenham.

Kelsey Park is managed by Bromley London Borough Council in partnership with Friends of Kelsey Park, a non-profit organisation formed in 1997 that consists of around 600 members and publishes the triannual Kelsey Park Magazine.

References

Parks and open spaces in the London Borough of Bromley